William Armyn (1561–1622) of Osgodby, South Kesteven, Lincolnshire, was an English politician and MP.

He was a Member (MP) of the Parliament of England for Grantham in 1589.

He was the father of Sir William Armine, 1st Baronet.

References

1561 births
1622 deaths
English MPs 1589